Barbara Meier is a former Swiss curler.

She competed at the 1988 Winter Olympics when curling was a demonstration sport.

Teams

References

External links
 

Living people
Swiss female curlers
Swiss curling champions
Curlers at the 1988 Winter Olympics
Olympic curlers of Switzerland
Year of birth missing (living people)
20th-century Swiss women